The 1960 All-Ireland Senior Camogie Championship was the high point of the 1960 season in Camogie. The championship was won by Dublin who defeated Galway by a 14-point margin in the final.

Changes in the old order
Dublin needed twenty minutes of extra time to beat Tipperary in the semi-final after what Agnes Hourigan described in the Irish Press as "one of the hardest, fastest and most exciting camogie matches ever played". Tipperary led 1-1 to nil at half time through a goal from Brid Scully, the score was 2–1 each at full time, Kathleen Mills shot a spectacular long range goal from a free in the first minute of extra time and Dublin never subsequently lost the lead, although Tipperary cut the lead back to a point. Galway shocked Antrim in the All Ireland semi-final at Casement Park with a bizarre match-winning goal. Antrim, led until three minutes from the end, when Chris Conway dropped a high lobbing ball into the Antrim goalmouth. The ball struck the in-rushing Emer Walsh on the top of the head and was deflected out of the reach of the Antrim goalkeeper for the winner

Final
Interest in the final had evaporated by the time it was played, delayed by the drawn All Ireland senior football final.

Final stages

 
MATCH RULES
50 minutes
Replay if scores level
Maximum of 3 substitutions

See also
 All-Ireland Senior Hurling Championship
 Wikipedia List of Camogie players
 National Camogie League
 Camogie All Stars Awards
 Ashbourne Cup

References

External links
 Camogie Association
 Historical reports of All Ireland finals
 All-Ireland Senior Camogie Championship: Roll of Honour
 Camogie on facebook
 Camogie on GAA Oral History Project

All-Ireland Senior Camogie Championship
1960
All-Ireland Senior Camogie Championship
All-Ireland Senior Camogie Championship